Galoubet may refer to:

 Galoubet A, a show jumping horse
 A type of Pipe (instrument)